Hamid Chabat ( – born 17 August 1953, Taza Province) is a Moroccan politician and the previous Secretary-General of the Istiqlal Party. Hamid Chabat has been the mayor of Fes since October 2003 and was elected on 23 September 2003 to lead his party, defeating rival Abdelouahed El Fassi, a relative of former incumbent Abbas El Fassi and grandson of Allal El Fassi.  Before holding  office, Chabat forged a name for himself in his party's trade union (General Union of Moroccan Workers aka UGTM).

Chabat also owns a regional newspaper covering the Fes region.
Chabat Left Istiqlal party to join Front of Democratic forces party in August 2021 ahead of the 2021 General Elections.

See also
Fes
Istiqlal Party
Abbas El Fassi

References

https://chabatonline.ma/%d9%86%d8%af%d9%88%d8%a9-%d8%b5%d8%ad%d9%81%d9%8a%d8%a9-%d9%84%d8%aa%d9%82%d8%af%d9%8a%d9%85-%d8%a7%d9%84%d8%a8%d8%b1%d9%86%d8%a7%d9%85%d8%ac-%d8%a7%d9%84%d8%a5%d9%86%d8%aa%d8%ae%d8%a7%d8%a8%d9%8a/

External links
Official website

Members of the House of Representatives (Morocco)
Living people
1953 births
People from Taza
People from Fez, Morocco
Moroccan newspaper editors
Moroccan trade unionists
Istiqlal Party politicians
Mayors of places in Morocco